Thai art encompasses a wide variety of styles and forms, including sculpture, painting, textiles, and decorative arts such as lacquerware and ceramics. The earliest known examples of Thai art date back to the prehistoric period and include bronze work and stone carvings from the Dvaravati civilization.

Thai art was influenced by indigenous civilizations of the Mon and Khmer. By the Sukhothai and Ayutthaya period, Thai art had developed its own unique style, further influenced by other Asian styles, particularly from Sri Lankan, Japanese, and Chinese cultures. Thai sculpture and painting flourished during this time, with the royal courts commissioning many temples and other religious structures. Thai art continued to thrive during the Rattanakosin period, which saw the construction of numerous palaces and temples in Bangkok.

Buddhism has played a significant role in Thai art, with traditional Thai sculpture often depicting images of the Buddha and Thai paintings frequently featuring scenes from Buddhist mythology or religious texts. Thai textiles, especially silk weaving, are also closely linked to Buddhist practices, often incorporating Buddhist symbols and imagery into intricate designs. Nature is another important source of inspiration for Thai art, with floral and animal motifs frequently appearing in works. The use of bright colors and intricate patterns is a hallmark of Thai art.

History

Prehistory

Prior to the southwards migration of the Thai peoples from Yunnan in the 10th century, mainland Southeast Asia had been a home to various indigenous communities for thousands of years. The discovery of Homo erectus fossils such as Lampang man is an example of archaic hominids. The remains were first discovered during excavations in Lampang Province. The finds have been dated from roughly 1,000,000–500,000 years ago in the Pleistocene. Stone artefacts dating to 40,000 years ago have been recovered from, e.g., Tham Lod rockshelter in Mae Hong Son and Lang Rongrien Rockshelter in Krabi, peninsular Thailand. The archaeological data between 18,000–3,000 years ago primarily derive from cave and rock shelter sites, and are associated with Hoabinhian foragers.

Dvaravati period
The Dvaravati period emerged in what is now central, northern, and northeastern Thailand during the 6th to 11th centuries CE. This era marked the spread of Buddhism and the rise of distinctive art styles. Dvaravati art was renowned for its skilled use of stone, particularly hard blue limestone or quartzite, to create intricate sculptures, stucco, and terracotta decorations. Artisans of great expertise produced works in the distinctive Dvaravati style, which often featured the Wheel of the Law and symmetrical Buddha images depicted standing or seated on thrones. The period was heavily influenced by the Mon people, and played a significant role in the spread of Buddhism and the development of Dvaravati art. Notable Dvaravati sites include Nakhon Pathom, Si Thep, Mueang Fa Daet Song Yang, Ku Bua, and Baan Dong Lakorn.

Sukhothai period
The Sukhothai period began in the 13th century. This era saw the flourishing of Buddhism and the creation of elegant Buddha images with sinuous bodies and slender, oval faces that emphasized the spiritual aspect of the Buddha. The images were often cast in metal rather than carved, which further enhanced their spiritual qualities.

In addition to its advancements in art, the Sukhothai Kingdom was also known for its innovations in architecture and city planning. During this time, the kingdom's capital city was laid out in a grid-like pattern, with roads and canals dividing the city into rectangular blocks. This urban planning reflected the concept of the universe in Buddhist cosmology and aimed to create a harmonious and balanced city that would facilitate spiritual and physical well-being.

The kingdom was also highly regarded for its exquisite glazed ceramics in the Sawankhalok style. The ceramics were fired at high temperatures, resulting in a strong and durable body. The vessels often featured delicate blue-green or grayish-green tints, with intricate designs painted in black or a darker hue of the glaze.Furthermore, Sukhothai period art is known for its unique use of the Phum khao bin pattern. This intricate pattern, consisting of interlocking circles, squares, and triangles, was used in the decoration of architecture, textiles, and other decorative arts. The pattern is believed to have originated from the lotus flower, an important symbol in Buddhism, and reflects the influence of Buddhism on Thai culture and artistic traditions.

Ayutthaya period
The surviving art from this period was primarily executed in stone, characterised by juxtaposed rows of Buddha figures. In the middle period, Sukhothai influence dominated, with large bronze or brick and stucco Buddha images, as well as decorations of gold leaf in free-form designs on a lacquered background. The late period was more elaborate, with Buddha images in royal attire, set on decorative bases.

Rattanakosin period
This period is characterized by the further development of the Ayutthaya style, rather than by more great innovation. One important element was the Krom Chang Sip Mu (Organization of the Ten Crafts), founded in Ayutthaya, which was responsible for improving the skills of the country's craftsmen.  Paintings from the mid-19th century show the influence of Western art.

Contemporary

Contemporary art in Thailand has evolved to encompass a variety of mediums, including modern painting, installations, photographs, prints, video art and performance art.

In the mid 1990s, a group of artists created the Chiang Mai Social Installation, which brought art and performance out of the traditional gallery setting and into the streets of Chiang Mai.

The Bangkok Biennial, launched in 2018, provides a platform for artists to showcase their work on an international stage. These developments reflect a growing interest in Thai contemporary art and the increasing willingness of artists to experiment with new forms of expression

Architecture

Architecture is the preeminent medium of the country's cultural legacy and reflects both the challenges of living in Thailand's sometimes extreme climate as well as, historically, the importance of architecture to the Thai people's sense of community and religious beliefs. Influenced by the architectural traditions of many of Thailand's neighbors, it has also developed significant regional variation within its vernacular and religious buildings.

Thai temples

Buddhist temples in Thailand are known as "wats", from the Pāḷi vāṭa, meaning an enclosure. A temple has an enclosing wall that divides it from the secular world. Wat architecture has seen many changes in Thailand in the course of history. Although there are many differences in layout and style, they all adhere to the same principles.

Traditional Thai houses

As the phrase "Thai stilt house" suggests, one universal aspect of Thailand's traditional architecture is the elevation of its buildings on stilts, most commonly to around head height. The area beneath the house is used for storage, crafts, lounging in the daytime, and sometimes for livestock. The houses were raised due to heavy flooding during certain parts of the year, and in more ancient times, predators. Thai building and living habits are often based on superstitious and religious beliefs. Many other considerations such as locally available materials, climate, and agriculture have a lot to do with the style.

Visual arts

Painting

Traditional

Traditional Thai painting is an ancient art form that has been passed down through generations in Thailand. The art form evolved through the Sukhothai, Ayutthaya, and Rattanakosin periods, with each era contributing unique elements to the style. The paintings typically feature flat images with lines as the main boundaries, and use secondary elements such as trees, mountains, streams, and rocks as dividing events or areas of the image. The use of color is flat paint and does not show shadows. Natural colors derived from earth elements, minerals, rocks, metals, plants, and some parts of animals are used in traditional Thai painting. The colors are often monochromatic, but there are also five-color variations called benjarong.

During the Sukhothai and Ayutthaya periods, traditional Thai painting evolved and was influenced by elements of the culture, including monochromatic and various colors. The paintings were found at various locations such as the ubosot, prang, viharn, sermon hall, ho trai, kuti, dharma cabinet, samut khoi, and phra bat. Ayutthaya period has more surviving examples of paintings, with many found in the form of murals on temple walls featuring Buddhism-related subjects such as history of the Buddha, Mahanipata Jataka, and Thep Chumnum.

In the Rattanakosin period traditional Thai painting was inspired by the events of the country, life, society, traditions, costumes, houses, temples, castles, palaces, nature, and various animals. Portraits and architecture stand out in groups, using strong colors and strongly contrasting opposite colors. The contrasting colors are balanced and harmonized. The composition of the picture often features the Tri Bhum image behind the principal Buddha image and a picture telling the story of the Lord Buddha and the Jataka tales on the side. Traditional Thai painting from this period is characterized by a heavy dark background and a heavy use of gold leaf.

From the end of the reign of King Rama III, the influence of Western painting began to flow into Thailand. This resulted in a modification of traditional Thai painting styles in various Buddhist places. The original flat images were transformed into deep, three-dimensional images that look more realistic, influenced by the Western style of painting. An important painter during the reign of King Rama IV was Khrua In Khong. He was one of the first Thai painters to experiment with the Western style of painting while maintaining the traditional Thai art form.

Many of the images in traditional Thai painting tell stories of the Lord Buddha, the Jataka tales, or important events in Thai history. The paintings often feature intricate details and designs that are specific to Thai culture, such as the traditional Thai costumes and architecture. Traditional Thai painting is still practiced today, with modern artists combining the traditional art form with contemporary techniques and styles.

Contemporary
One of the pioneers of modern Thai painting is Khrua In Khong, who is highly regarded for his expressive and atmospheric works that break free from traditional painting rules. His art emphasizes the value of painting beyond just theoretical reasons, inspiring future generations of Thai artists to create unique and innovative works. Starting from 1957, the influence of European art movements such as Impressionism, Cubism, and Surrealism became more evident in the works of Thai painters, including Fua Haripitak, Sawat Tantisuk, Kiettisak Chanonnart, Ithipol Thangchalok, Tuan Thirapichit, and Decha Warachoon.

Sculpture 

Thai sculpture is a diverse and intricate art form that encompasses various styles and techniques, from the shallow depths of bas relief to the three-dimensional forms of high relief and floating round reliefs, and is often used for religious purposes as well as for decorative and functional objects such as pottery.

Wood carving
Wood is one of the most commonly available materials in tropical regions. In Thailand, the most commonly used woods for carving are teak, takhian, rosewood, padu, and makha. Wood carving has been a traditional craft in Thailand for centuries, with skilled artisans creating a wide variety of objects, including decorative items and functional pieces such as doors, windows, Buddha images, and decorative patterns for buildings and furniture.

Stone carving
Thai sculpture almost exclusively depicts images of the Buddha, being very similar with the other styles from Southeast Asia, such as Khmer. Most of the sculptures depict Buddha. An exception is the dvarapala.

Fruit and vegetable carving

Crafts and decorative arts
Chang Sip Mu refers to ten different types of craftsmen highly respected in Thai culture. The term "Chang" means a skilled artisan or technician, while "Sip Mu" means ten groups. This tradition dates back to the Ayutthaya period, where there were even more groups of craftsmen. Each group has a specific skill set, including drawing and painting, carving, engraving, turning, casting, molding and sculpting, model building, lacquering, metal beating, and plastering. For centuries, these craftsmen have passed down their skills through generations. Their works of art include Buddha images, lacquerware, metalwork, and decorative patterns.

Basketry
Wicker weaving has been an integral part of Thailand's handicraft tradition for centuries. Thai craftsmen have honed their skills in creating wicker products made from various materials such as bamboo, rattan, palm leaves, coconut leaf, krajood leaf, lipao, and other plant-based materials. These products are commonly found in Thai households and range from furniture pieces like chairs and tables to smaller items like baskets, trays, lamps, and other. The craft is typically passed down through families and small workshops, where the next generation of craftsmen learns the techniques and intricacies of wicker weaving.

Ceramics

Dolls

Glass blowing
Glass blowing has evolved over time, with the introduction of new techniques to enhance the beauty and artistic value of the work. Sandblasting is used to create a turbid surface, while gilding with gold leaves and coating with flaxseed oil are common methods to create a value-added product that is more attractive and worthy of collection. These tactics have contributed to the popularity of glass blowing as an art form, with a range of works produced in Thailand since its introduction in 1977. Today, there are training courses and institutions that produce scientific tools, making glass blowing accessible to both children and adults. The works produced vary in price and complexity, ranging from inexpensive animal figures to collectible sculptures like the mythical Royal Barge Suphannahong and other creatures.

Textiles

Patterns and motifs
Patterns in Thai art and design are often inspired by nature, including plants and animals. These patterns are commonly used to adorn buildings, clothing, and household items for various occasions. Thai artists and craftspeople draw inspiration from a variety of natural elements, such as lotus flowers, garlands, smoke, incense, and candle flames, to create unique and diverse patterns. Lotuses, including the sacred lotus, double red lotus, and magnolia lotus, have served as inspiration for many of these patterns, while others have been inspired by the swaying flames.

Kranok pattern: The pattern is usually represented as a triangular shape with unequal sides or a lotus bud shape and is composed of three parts: the body, the tail, and the top. Skilled craftsmen create the intricate designs using knotting techniques. Kranok is derived from nature, based on the four elements of earth, water, wind, and fire, and must consist of the five elements of flora, which include clumps, sheaths, branches, and leaves. These elements are tied together in a pattern to form Kranok. The pattern has been widely used in Thai art, architecture, and crafts and is still celebrated today as a symbol of Thai heritage and culture.

Krajung pattern: The structure of the pattern is in the form of an equilateral triangle, resembling the petals of a lotus or sugarcane leaves. The sides are pointed and separated, as if being pulled apart. This pattern is commonly used as a decorative border, such as on traditional Thai wooden furniture or on the top of Thai architectural features.

Prajam yam pattern: The structure of the pattern is in the form of a square, resembling a four-petal flower. It is a popular decorative motif in Thai art and can be used to create continuous patterns or as individual floating flowers. The Prajam yam pattern is commonly used as a repeating motif in decorative patterns, such as on textiles, pottery, and architecture.

Phum khao bin pattern: The structure of the pattern is in the shape of a cluster of rice seeds, or the shape of a lotus bud. This pattern is often seen in Thai architecture, such as the chedi dated to the Sukhothai period.

Kap pattern: A tall pattern used to decorate or wrap around the base of poles or various rectangular shapes in architectural works. It resembles sugarcane or bamboo, and the pattern itself has protruding parts.

Nok khab and Nak khob pattern: This pattern features the face of a bird or naga with its beak covering or incorporating other patterns. The design is typically located at the joint where the stem connects to the flower or leaf, and is a common decorative element in Thai art and architecture.

Metalworks

Damascene
Damasceneware, also known as Kram in Thai, involves inlaying refined silver or gold stripes into a carved pattern on steel objects like scissors, cane heads, and royal weapons. It is believed to have been influenced by the Persians who traded with Thailand during the Ayutthaya period. The method of inlaying silver is called Kram Ngern and gold is called Kram Thong. As the weapons of troop leaders during the Ayutthaya and early Rattanakosin periods were also used by the kings, they needed to be beautifully decorated. However, as the weapons were made of iron, it was impossible to use precious stones or enamel for decoration. The only option was to use inlay work. This technique was also used for decorating the costumes of royal family members and auspicious royal articles like regalia, which symbolized regal authority.

Niello
Nielloware, also known as Thom in Thai, is a technique used to decorate silverware and goldware. The technique involves carving intricate patterns onto a metal surface and filling the grooves with a black mixture, making the pattern more visible. Historically, nielloware was used as rank decorations and was considered exclusive to the upper class. There are several categories of nielloware, including silver or black nielloware, gold nielloware, Thom Ta Thong, and Thom Chuthathut. Thom Ta Thong involves silver nielloware with gold painted on certain places, while Thom Chuthathut is an inlay technique on silver plates. The art of nielloware has been passed down through generations of artisans. To create nielloware, the artisan carves the desired pattern onto the metal surface, then applies a black mixture to the grooves, making the pattern more visible. The technique requires a steady hand and a great deal of patience to produce the intricate designs that are characteristic of nielloware.

Lacquerware

Lai rot nam

The art of Lai rot nam is a time-honored tradition in Thailand that involves using gold leaf and black lacquer to decorate various objects with intricate and delicate designs. This art form requires exceptional skill and precision to execute properly, as the gold leaf must be applied in various designs that can range from simple geometric patterns to intricate depictions of mythical creatures and scenes from Buddhist mythology. The use of black lacquer, which is made from the resin of the Rak tree, creates a contrast against the gold leaf and enhances the visual impact of the overall design.

Long rak pid thong
Long rak pid thong is a refined and intricate Thai art form that employs gold leaf to embellish lacquered surfaces. This technique involves layering Rak resin onto a chosen material and allowing each layer to dry before proceeding to the next. Once the surface is smooth, artisans meticulously apply gold leaf by hand or brush, carefully following engraved lines and intricate patterns. Long rak pid thong is used to adorn various objects, including furniture, utensils, religious artifacts, and architectural elements such as chofa, bairaka, and arches.

Mother-of-pearl inlay
Mother-of-pearl inlay, also referred to as Muk or Pradab muk in Thai, involves the meticulous process of engraving and decorating small pieces of shell onto utensils using a binder called Rak. The iridescent colors produced by the reflecting shells create a stunning contrast against the black background. In the past, Muk was mainly used in royal institutions and Buddhist sacred sites. Today, the craft is primarily utilized for creating small souvenirs like pedestal bowls, trays, cigarette cases, and lighters due to its time-consuming production process.

Pradab krachok
Another variation of Thai lacquer art is Pradab krachok, which involves the use of lacquer and mosaic decorations on traditional utensils, Khon apparel, and architectural details. Thai craftsmen follow a traditional method of first coating the chosen material with Rak lacquer before placing small glass pieces. They then apply a special mixture of boiled resin and powder made from burnt coconut shell, bricks, dried banana leaf, or rak samuk, which is a mixture of Rak resin and the ashes of dried banana leaves or grass. As the mixture seeps between the glass pieces and forms a seal, it prevents water from entering.

Lacquer painting
Lacquer painting, or Lai kammalor in Thai, is a technique that involves the use of powdered color and Rak varnish or its sun-dried raw form to create intricate works of art. The black resin board serves as the painting's background, and it is often accentuated by gold leaf or powder. Lacquer paintings are typically found on doors, windows, cabinets, partitions, and gold-gilded surfaces in Thailand. Although the technique had disappeared after the fall of Ayutthaya, it was revived successfully during the reign of King Rama III. However, the art form slowly declined again after his death.

Khrueang khoen
Khrueang khoen involves a lacquering technique that creates wooden and rattan items with a Rak resin latex surface. The surface is decorated with motifs created through scratching techniques or the application of vermillion or gold leaves. The craft originated from the Khün people who migrated into Northern Thailand from Kengtung in Shan state, Myanmar.

Paper
Samut khoi is an ancient type of Thai book that has been crafted for centuries from the bark of the Streblus asper tree. This type of paper is highly valued for its durability and is perfect for writing important documents and texts. Thai paper-making also involves the use of mulberry tree fibers to create Sa paper. This paper is known for its strength and versatility, making it ideal for use in traditional crafts such as lanterns, umbrellas, and parasols, which are often embellished with vibrant patterns and colors. Mulberry paper is also used in the intricate art of khon mask-making, as well as in the creation of wao, colorful kites that are flown during festivals and competitions.

Performing arts

Mahorasop

Dance

Lakhon

Khon

Ram

Fon

Rabam

Music

Piphat

Mahori

Theatre

Likay

Hun lakhon lek

Shadow play 

Shadow theatre in Thailand is called nang yai; in the south there is a tradition called nang talung. Nang yai puppets are normally made of cowhide and rattan. Performances are normally accompanied by a combination of songs and chants. Performances in Thailand were temporarily suspended in 1960 due to a fire at the national theatre. Nang drama has influenced modern Thai cinema, including filmmakers like Cherd Songsri and Payut Ngaokrachang.

Martial arts

Muay Thai

Krabi krabong

Language arts

Literature

Poetry

See also

 Buddha images in Thailand
 Cinema of Thailand
 Culture of Thailand
 History of Asian art
 Iconography of Gautama Buddha in Laos and Thailand
 Khon
 List of Buddhist temples in Thailand
 Music of Thailand
 Thaitone

References

Further reading

External links

Rama IX Art Museum Virtual museum of Thai contemporary artists. Listings of museums, galleries, exhibitions and venues. Contains muchinformation on Thai artists and art activities.
Golden Triangle Art Introduction of contemporary art and artists living and working in Northern Thailand and Myanmar. Guide to art galleries, art News and exhibitions with focus on Chiang Mai.
Thai Buddhist Art Thai Buddhist Art Website Project to Promote and play a part in the growth of the Thai Fine Art Community of Collectors and Aficionados. Representing a host of Thailand's Most Outstanding Artists.
Online display of the 19th-century Thai Manuscript Traiphum (Illustrated Text on Cosmology) from the Harvard Art Museums’ collections.

 
Art by country